John's Phone is a minimalist mobile phone that claims to be the world's most basic cellphone, allowing the user only to make and receive calls, with none of the features of modern smartphones such as a camera, internet access and text messaging. Phone numbers and addresses are written on a small physical paper booklet stored on the back. It was designed and developed by Hein Mevissen and Diederiekje Bok of Dutch advertising and design agency John Doe Amsterdam. It is marketed as being ideal for children, the elderly, and technophobes.

Features 
When the 1,200 mAh battery is full, the display will show the word "JOHNS" along the right. The lower the battery, the fewer letters are displayed. The battery lasts about 3 weeks in standby mode or 6 hours of calling time. The device supports ringing and vibration. Although it has no speakerphone, it does come with an earphone/microphone headset that can be plugged into its micro-USB port. It has a speed dial component, and is able to show caller ID on its screen. The device is not locked, making it compatible with any SIM using the GSM system. The keypad consists of only the numbers 0 to 9, an asterisk, a hash, and the call and end buttons. It includes a 32-page paper address book kept on the back of the handset and a pen that resembles a stylus. The booklet contains tongue-in-cheek "text messaging" and "games" (tic-tac-toe) sections. The designers say that these features allow the phone to be used even when it is turned off.

Reception 
Although the phone has been promoted as being "the world's simplest phone" and "the anti-smartphone" by the tech media, it has also been criticized for being overpriced for its so-called simplicity, rough plastic construction, and poor ergonomics.

In December 2010, Fast Company selected John's Phone for its "12 of the Year's Best Ideas in Interface Designs" list.

The phone was included in the initial collection of the Museum of Ideas and Innovation in Barcelona (Miba) in Barcelona, Spain, which opened in 2011.

References 

Mobile phone manufacturers
Mobile phones by company
Dutch brands
Dutch inventions
product design